The Nicholson River is a river in the Kimberley region of Western Australia. It takes its name from the Nicholson Plains, named in 1879 by Alexander Forrest after Sir Charles Nicholson, the central figure in the circle of Australian 'colonists' in London, and a promoter of the Forrest brothers' explorations. In 1870 Nicholson had presented a paper entitled On Forrest's Expedition into the Interior of Western Australia, Goyder's Survey of the Neighbourhood of Port Darwin, and on the Recent Progress of Australian Discovery to a meeting of the Royal Geographical Society of London.

The river rises just north of Koolerong Bore then flows south-west through Nicholson and through Marella Gorge then turning north and discharging into the Ord River on the eastern edge of Purnululu National Park near Doughboy Hill.

There are eleven tributaries of the Nicholson including; Bamboo Creek, Bull Creek, Clean Skin Creek, Red Bank Creek, Tyson Creek and Wire Creek.

References 

Rivers of the Kimberley region of Western Australia
Ord River